The Group 5: Mathematics subjects of the IB Diploma Programme consist of two different mathematics courses, both of which can be taken at Standard Level (SL) or Higher Level (HL). To earn an IB Diploma, a candidate must take either Mathematics Applications and Interpretation (SL/HL) or Mathematics Analysis and Approaches (SL/HL).

Feedback on the Subject 
Despite being mandatory subject and considered to be one of the most difficult subjects, students find themselves in easy spots at the math courses in university as they have already passed the first-year programme course. No matter how low or high the math grade is on the IB Diploma Paper, IB students definitely feel more ease at the university math courses in comparison to others.

Resources 
It is highly recommended to acquire paid applications and services of Mathematics overview, especially if you are taking High Level. Moreover, collaborating with your peers could become more effective study method than completing the material by yourself.

Footnotes

References

International Baccalaureate